Martin Stanford "Stanley" Robison (March 30, 1854 – March 24, 1911) was an American owner and manager in Major League Baseball. Robison was the owner of the St. Louis Cardinals from 1899 to 1911, along with his brother Frank. He was also part-owner of the Cleveland Spiders for most of their existence, from 1887 to 1899. During the  season, he took over as manager of the Cardinals for the final 50 games. He finished with a managerial record of 19 wins, 31 losses in 50 games. Born in Pittsburgh, Pennsylvania, he died in Cleveland, Ohio, where he is interred at Lake View Cemetery.

See also
St. Louis Cardinals managers and ownership

References

External links
Baseball-Reference manager page

1859 births
1911 deaths
St. Louis Cardinals managers
Sportspeople from Pittsburgh
Cleveland Spiders